Wola Cieklińska  (Volia Tseklyns’ka) is a village in the administrative district of Gmina Dębowiec, within Jasło County, Subcarpathian Voivodeship, in south-eastern Poland.

References

Villages in Jasło County